Ham Heung-chul (17 November 1930 – 11 September 2000) was a South Korean football player and manager. While playing for the South Korea national football team, Ham won two titles in the AFC Asian Cup and three silver medals in the Asian Games. He also participated in the 1964 Summer Olympics, but conceded 20 goals during three Olympic matches. After retirement, Ham managed South Korean national team, winning the 1978 Asian Games. He also managed Hallelujah FC, and became the first manager to win the K League title.

While climbing Mt. Seorak, Ham lost his footing and fell off a cliff on 11 September 2000. This accident was his last moment.

Honours

Player 
	ROK Army OPMG
Korean National Championship: 1954
Korean President's Cup runner-up: 1957

	Korea Tungsten
Korean Semi-professional League (Spring): 1965
Korean Semi-professional League (Autumn): 1965, 1966
Korean President's Cup: 1965, 1966

South Korea
AFC Asian Cup: 1956, 1960
Asian Games silver medal: 1954, 1958, 1962

Individual
KASA Best Korean Footballer: 1961

Manager 
South Korea
Asian Games: 1978

Hallelujah FC
K League 1: 1983

Individual
K League 1 Manager of the Year: 1983

References

External links
 
 Ham Heung-chul at KFA

1930 births
2000 deaths
South Korean footballers
South Korea international footballers
Hallelujah FC managers
South Korean football managers
1954 FIFA World Cup players
1956 AFC Asian Cup players
1960 AFC Asian Cup players
Footballers at the 1964 Summer Olympics
AFC Asian Cup-winning players
Olympic footballers of South Korea
Asian Games medalists in football
Footballers at the 1954 Asian Games
Footballers at the 1958 Asian Games
Footballers at the 1962 Asian Games
Footballers from Seoul
Asian Games silver medalists for South Korea
Association football goalkeepers
Medalists at the 1954 Asian Games
Medalists at the 1958 Asian Games
Medalists at the 1962 Asian Games
20th-century South Korean people